Hans-Peter Jakst (born 23 July 1954) is a German former racing cyclist. He won the German National Road Race in 1979. He also competed at the 1976 Summer Olympics.

References

External links
 

1954 births
Living people
German male cyclists
Sportspeople from Osnabrück
German cycling road race champions
Olympic cyclists of West Germany
Cyclists at the 1976 Summer Olympics
Cyclists from North Rhine-Westphalia
20th-century German people